Philipp Eduard Anton von Lenard (7 June 1862 – 20 May 1947) was a Hungarian-born German physicist and the winner of the Nobel Prize for Physics in 1905 for his work on cathode rays and the discovery of many of their properties. One of his most important contributions was the experimental realization of the photoelectric effect. He discovered that the energy (speed) of the electrons ejected from a cathode depends only on the wavelength, and not the intensity, of the incident light.

Lenard was a nationalist and anti-Semite; as an active proponent of the Nazi ideology, he supported Adolf Hitler in the 1920s and was an important role model for the "Deutsche Physik" movement during the Nazi period. Notably, he labeled Albert Einstein's contributions to science as "Jewish physics".

Early life and work
Philipp Lenard was born in Pressburg (Pozsony, today's Bratislava), on 7 June 1862 in the Kingdom of Hungary. The Lenard family had originally come from Tyrol in the 17th century, while his mother's family originated from Baden, the parents were German-speaking. His father, Philipp von Lenardis (1812–1896), was a wine-merchant in Pressburg. His mother was Antonie Baumann (1831–1865). The young Lenard studied at the Pozsonyi Királyi Katolikus Főgymnasium (today Gamča), and as he writes it in his autobiography, this made a big impression on him (especially the personality of his teacher, Virgil Klatt).  In 1880, he studied physics and chemistry in Vienna and in Budapest. In 1882, Lenard left Budapest and returned to Pressburg, but in 1883, he moved to Heidelberg after his tender for an assistant's position in the University of Budapest was refused. In Heidelberg, he studied under the illustrious Robert Bunsen, interrupted by one semester in Berlin with Hermann von Helmholtz, and he obtained a doctoral degree in 1886. In 1887 he worked again in Budapest under Loránd Eötvös as a demonstrator. After posts at Aachen, Bonn, Breslau, Heidelberg (1896–1898), and Kiel (1898–1907), he returned finally to the University of Heidelberg in 1907 as the head of the Philipp Lenard Institute. In 1905, Lenard became a member of the Royal Swedish Academy of Sciences, and in 1907, of the Hungarian Academy of Sciences.

His early work included studies of phosphorescence and luminescence and the conductivity of flames.

Contributions to physics

Photoelectric investigations

As a physicist, Lenard's major contributions were in the study of cathode rays, which he began in 1888. Prior to his work, cathode rays were produced in primitive, partially evacuated glass tubes that had metallic electrodes in them, across which a high voltage could be placed. Cathode rays were difficult to study using this arrangement, because they were inside sealed glass tubes, difficult to access, and because the rays were in the presence of air molecules. Lenard overcame these problems by devising a method of making small metallic windows in the glass that were thick enough to be able to withstand the pressure differences, but thin enough to allow passage of the rays. Having made a window for the rays, he could pass them out into the laboratory, or, alternatively, into another chamber that was completely evacuated. These windows have come to be known as Lenard windows. He was able to conveniently detect the rays and measure their intensity by means of paper sheets coated with phosphorescent materials.

Lenard observed that the absorption of cathode rays was, to first order, proportional to the density of the material they were made to pass through. This appeared to contradict the idea that they were some sort of electromagnetic radiation. He also showed that the rays could pass through some inches of air of a normal density, and appeared to be scattered by it, implying that they must be particles that were even smaller than the molecules in air. He confirmed some of J. J. Thomson's work, which eventually arrived at the understanding that cathode rays were streams of negatively charged energetic particles. He called them quanta of electricity or for short quanta, after Helmholtz, while Thomson proposed the name corpuscles, but eventually electrons became the everyday term. In conjunction with his and other earlier experiments on the absorption of the rays in metals, the general realization that electrons were constituent parts of the atom enabled Lenard to claim correctly that for the most part atoms consist of empty space. He proposed that every atom consists of empty space and electrically neutral corpuscules called "dynamids", each consisting of an electron and an equal positive charge.

As a result of his Crookes tube investigations, he showed that the rays produced by irradiating metals in a vacuum with ultraviolet light were similar in many respects to cathode rays. His most important observations were that the energy of the rays was independent of the light intensity, but was greater for shorter wavelengths of light.

These latter observations were explained by Albert Einstein as a quantum effect. This theory predicted that the plot of the cathode ray energy versus the frequency would be a straight line with a slope equal to Planck's constant, h. This was shown to be the case some years later. The photo-electric quantum theory was the work cited when Einstein was awarded the Nobel Prize in Physics in 1921. Suspicious of the general adulation of Einstein, Lenard became a prominent skeptic of relativity and of Einstein's theories generally; he did not, however, dispute Einstein's explanation of the photoelectric effect. Lenard grew extremely resentful of the credit accorded to Wilhelm Röntgen, who received the first Nobel Prize in physics in 1901, for the discovery of the X-ray, despite the fact that Röntgen was German and a non-Jew. Lenard wrote that he, not Roentgen, was the "mother of the X-rays," since he had invented the apparatus used to produce them. Lenard likened Röntgen's role to that of a "midwife" who merely assists with the birth.

Lenard received the 1905 Nobel Prize for Physics in recognition of this work.

Meteorological contributions
Lenard was the first person to study what has been termed the Lenard effect in 1892. This is the separation of electric charges accompanying the aerodynamic breakup of water drops. It is also known as spray electrification or the waterfall effect.

He conducted studies on the size and shape distributions of raindrops and constructed a novel wind tunnel in which water droplets of various sizes could be held stationary for a few seconds. He was the first to recognize that large raindrops are not tear-shaped, but are rather shaped something like a hamburger bun.

Deutsche Physik

Lenard is remembered today as a strong German nationalist who despised "English physics", which he considered to have stolen its ideas from Germany. During the Nazi regime, he was the outspoken proponent of the idea that Germany should rely on "Deutsche Physik" and ignore what he considered the fallacious and deliberately misleading ideas of "Jewish physics", by which he meant chiefly the theories of Albert Einstein, including "the Jewish fraud" of relativity (see also criticism of the theory of relativity). An advisor to Adolf Hitler, Lenard became Chief of Aryan Physics under the Nazis.

Some measure of Lenard's views on certain scientists may be deduced through examination of Lenard's book, Great Men in Science, A History of Scientific Progress, first published in English in 1933. The book was translated into English by H. Stafford Hatfield with an introduction by his onetime student Edward Andrade of University College London, and was widely read in schools and universities after the Second World War. The individual scientists selected for inclusion by Lenard do not include Einstein or Marie Curie, nor any other twentieth-century scientist.  Andrade noted that "A strong individuality like that of the writer of this book is bound to assert strongly individual judgements". The publisher included what now appears to be a remarkable understatement on page xix of the 1954 English edition: "While Professor Lenard's studies of the men of science who preceded him showed not only profound knowledge but also admirable balance, when it came to men of his own time he was apt to let his own strong views on contemporary matters sway his judgment. In his lifetime he would not consent to certain modifications that were proposed in the last study of the series".

Later life
Lenard retired from Heidelberg University as professor of theoretical physics in 1931. He achieved emeritus status there, but he was expelled from his post by Allied occupation forces in 1945 when he was 83. The Helmholtz-Gymnasium Heidelberg had been named the Philipp Lenard Schule from 1927 until 1945. As part of the elimination of Nazi street names and monuments it was renamed in September 1945 by order of the military government. Lenard died in 1947 in Messelhausen, Germany.

Honours and awards
 Royal Society: Rumford Medal, 1896
 Italian Society of Sciences: Matteucci Medal, 1896
 French Academy of Sciences: Prix La Caze, 1897
 Franklin Institute: Franklin Medal, 1932
 Nobel Prize for Physics, 1905
 A crater near the north pole of the moon was named in his honor from 2005 (approved in 2008) until 2020. When the International Astronomical Union learned of Lenard's Nazi connection, they decided to drop the name.

Cultural references
 Lenard's criticism of the theory of relativity and his crusade against Einstein and his theories was covered in an episode of Dark Matters: Twisted But True, in a segment entitled "Einstein's Revenge".
 The life of Lenard and the interrelationship between his work and that of Albert Einstein is the subject of the book The Man Who Stalked Einstein: How Nazi Scientist Philipp Lenard Changed the Course of History by Bruce J. Hillman, Birgit Ertl-Wagner and Bernd C. Wagner.
 Lenard was portrayed by actor Michael McElhatton in the 2017 National Geographic anthology period drama television series Genius.
Lenard featured as the villain in the seventh episode of Super Science Friends.

Bibliography

Lenard, Philipp (1931) (in German). Erinnerungen eines Naturforschers. New edition: Erinnerungen eines Naturforschers – Kritische annotierte Ausgabe des Originaltyposkriptes von 1931/1843 (Arne Schirrmacher, ed.). Springer Verlag, Heidelberg 2010, 344 pages, e-.

 1. Einleitung und Mechanik, 2. Akustik und Wärmelehre, 3. Optik, Elektrostatik und Anfänge der Elektrodynamik (or: 3. Optik und Elektrizitätslehre 1. Teil), 4. Magnetismus, Elektrodynamik und Anfänge von weiterem (or: Elektrizitätslehre 2. Teil). Later editions, 1943

Notes

See also
Cavity magnetron
Fluid thread breakup

References

External links

  including the Nobel Lecture, May 28, 1906 On Cathode Rays
 On Cathode Rays
 The Cathode Ray Tube site
 
 

1862 births
1947 deaths
20th-century German physicists
Austro-Hungarian emigrants to Germany
Austro-Hungarian Nobel laureates
Experimental physicists
19th-century German inventors
German Nobel laureates
Heidelberg University alumni
Hungarian Nobel laureates
19th-century Hungarian physicists
Members of the Prussian Academy of Sciences
Members of the Royal Swedish Academy of Sciences
Militant League for German Culture members
Nazi Party politicians
Nobel laureates in Physics
Relativity critics
Scientists from Bratislava
Academic staff of the University of Bonn
Academic staff of the University of Breslau
Academic staff of the University of Kiel
Recipients of the Matteucci Medal